Darosava is a village in the municipality of Aranđelovac, Serbia. According to the 2002 census, the village has a population of 2023 people.

One of the oldest orthodox log-churches in Serbia in located on the outskirts of the village.

References

External links

Populated places in Šumadija District